The Central District of Haftkel County is a district (bakhsh) in Haftkel County, Khuzestan Province, Iran. At the 2006 census, its population was 17,281, in 3,663 families.  The district has one city: Haftkel. The district has one rural district (dehestan): Howmeh Rural District.

References 

Haftkel County
Districts of Khuzestan Province